Floor marking tapes are adhesive tapes used to mark hazards, divide spaces, create aisles, or provide directions.  They are commonly used in industrial and manufacturing facilities for floor marking.  They are made of multiple different materials, including PVC and vinyl, and vary in thickness from 5-mils to 55-mils for a wide range of durability options for manufacturing facility floor marking. The best floor marking tapes are usually 50 to 60 mils thick. Most tapes come in a variety of color options and even hazard patterns to meet U.S. Occupational Safety and Health Administration/ANSI requirements and other safety standards. Some tapes are made with higher reflectivity and may even glow in the dark.

Floor marking tapes can also be useful for helping workers put materials and equipment back in the right place, making it a key 5S, Lean manufacturing implementation tools. Creating distinctions between finished goods, raw goods, to-be-repaired goods, and equipment ensures mistakes are minimized and productivity and safety are both at the highest levels.

Usage

5S and Lean manufacturing
Floor markings are an important part of step 2 of 5S, Set In Order (Seiton), organizing workspaces by denoting walkways, work spaces and storage spaces. In addition, floor markings are used to denote requirements to keep the area in front of fire extinguishers, fire hoses, first aid equipment and exits clear.

Hiroyuki Hirano's 5 Pillar of the Visual Workplace, proposed a scheme for markings that used not only color, but the size of the line and if the line was solid or broken, to convey meaning, expanding the possible messages that could be communicate, with only three colors.

Building evacuation
A way of satisfying this requirement is photoluminescent tape, which glows in darkness without any external power source. The IFC also requires that obstacles that are within  of the floor surface be marked with luminescent striped tape, with an alternating striped pattern of luminous material and non-luminous black.

OSHA regulations
OSHA does not have a specific standard for floor marking. However other rules and policy interpretations has provided some guidelines.

1910.175(a) requires when mechanical handling equipment, such as forklifts and Powered industrial trucks are used, that permeant aisles and passageways must be marked. The agency also indicated that any color could be used and that the line could be continuous or formed by a series of dots, squares, stripes, as long as it was clear it defined an aisle area.

Materials

Tape
Tapes are replacement for paints for floor marking. Tapes are much faster and easier to install and replace, which dramatically reduces down times related to painting aisles and rails. Many floor tapes are scuff and break resistant, unlike paints that will chip and scratch off. Tapes that are printed with stripes, chevrons and Sillitoe tartan patterns are far easier and faster to install than the same patterns when painted. Floor tapes also have a storage advantage, with being less temperamental, with longer shelf lives than paints. However, tape does have drawbacks. It can tear, peel and fail to adhere to some floor surfaces. Further, tape can introduce a trip hazard if it is peeling.

See also
 List of adhesive tapes
 Barricade tape
 Safety sign
 5S
 Lean manufacturing

References

Adhesive tape
Signage
Occupational safety and health